David Astle (born 9 November 1961) is an Australian TV personality and radio host, and writer of non-fiction, fiction and plays. He also co-hosted the SBS Television (SBS) show Letters and Numbers, as the dictionary expert, in company with Richard Morecroft and Lily Serna, a role to which he returned for Celebrity Letters and Numbers in 2021.

Career 
Astle's cryptic crosswords, appearing under the name "DA" in The Age and The Sydney Morning Herald (for which he also writes the "Wordplay" section), have developed a large following which includes musician Holly Throsby and actor Geoffrey Rush. Rush called him "the Sergeant Pepper of cryptic crosswords". In 2011, his portrait called "DA" painted by artist Amanda Marburg, was shortlisted for the Archibald Prize.

Astle's 2013 book Cluetopia: The story of 100 years of the crossword celebrates the centenary of the crossword with a chapter for each year. Astle is a three times winner of the Banjo Paterson Writing Award. He won third prize in The Age Short Story Award in 1990 and his first novel, Marzipan Plan, was shortlisted for the Miles Franklin Award. In 2001 he won the James Joyce Suspended Sentence Award for short fiction. His play Cowboy Humour was part of the Short and Sweet play festival in 2008, which has previously featured Astle's plays including The Gentleman Had An Axe in 2007 and The Mercy Kitchen.

Astle has taught journalism at RMIT University and in 2004 was awarded a DSC Teaching Award for best sessional teacher. In 2013, he helped create the word "phub" (a portmanteau of phone and snub), for when someone is ignored in favour of a mobile phone).

From 2015 he was a fill-in host on ABC Radio Melbourne as well as a regular word expert on ABC TV's News Breakfast.

In December 2019, Astle was appointed as host of the Evenings radio program on ABC Radio Melbourne and ABC Local Radio in Victoria replacing Lindy Burns. Throughout 2019 Astle filled in for Burns whilst she was on long service leave.

Bibliography

Novels
Marzipan Plan
The Book of Miles (Minerva, 1997) 1-86330-589-0

Non-fiction
 "Rewording the Brain" (Allen & Unwin, 2018) 
 "Riddledom: 101 Riddles and Their Stories" (Allen & Unwin, 2015) 
 "Cluetopia: The story of 100 years of the crossword" (Allen & Unwin, 2013)  
 "Puzzles and Words 1" (Allen & Unwin, 2013) 9781743318546
 "Puzzles and Words 2" (Allen & Unwin, 2013) 9781743318546
 Puzzled: Secrets and Clues From a Life Lost in Words (Allen & Unwin, 2010) 
 Cassowary Crossing (Penguin Books, 2005) ; (re-jacketed as Offbeat Australia (Penguin Books, 2007) )
 One Down, One Missing (Hardie Grant Books, 2003) 9781740661416

For children 
 Wordburger (Allen & Unwin, 2015) 
 David Astle's Gargantuan Book of Words (Allen & Unwin, 2017) 
 David Astle's 101 Weird Words (and 3 fakes): From Ambidextrous to Zugzwang (Allen & Unwin, 2018)

Plays 
 The Gentleman Had an Axe (2007)
 Cowboy Humour (2008)
 The Mercy Kitchen (2008)

References

External links 
Official site
Cryptopia, a short documentary on DA and his crosswords
Hacronyms, an article by David Astle
The DA Trippers, a blog that pays homage to DA cryptics
Alias DA, an essay that originally appeared in Meanjin about how Astle sees words and the world
Astle's profile on Letters and Numbers website
David Astle Re-works Words a Wheeler Centre video
David Astle on ABC's The Conversation Hour
Phubbing: A Word is Born video
Leaping lexicons: David Astle and the joy of words on ABC's Conversations
Do Not Ask for Whom the Pinball Chimes, David Astle at the Wheeler Centre Gala 2017.
David Astle on ABC Radio.
Lunch with David Astle: How he creates his notoriously tricky crosswords.

1961 births
Living people
20th-century Australian novelists
20th-century Australian male writers
Australian male novelists
Australian male dramatists and playwrights
20th-century Australian dramatists and playwrights
21st-century Australian dramatists and playwrights
Australian non-fiction writers
Writers from Melbourne
People educated at Barker College
21st-century Australian male writers
Crossword compilers
Male non-fiction writers